The Vulcans were a British cult band from the 1980s. It combined punk, folk and rock and roll, often augmented by humorous lyrics and outrageous dance routines.

Early career
The Vulcans' first live show was at the Irish Club, Elm Grove, Portsmouth in 1979. Sue Vulcan was now on vocals after the original singer, Pete Vulcan, quit just before the debut show. By the early 1980s, the band's sound and image was influenced by Bow Wow Wow and The Clash. Early songs included "There's A Riot Going on in The City", "Brain Cancer" and "Ear Muffs". Gigs at the Bum in the Air Festival and the college circuit followed.

Later career
By 1983, all band members had relocated to Harlesden, and the most successful line-up, Dan Vulcan, Harry Vulcan, Mark Vulcan, Nick Vulcan, Pete Vulcan and Ray Vulcan began busking in London's Covent Garden. They met Eddie Izzard there, who later invited The Vulcans to be the house band on his first television series; and later The Vicious Boys, who commissioned the band to compose and perform the theme for their LWT series, Wake Up London.

After a successful European tour in 1983, the band unexpectedly split as three members of the band (Vulcans Dan, Mark and Ray) embarked on art college courses. This career detour lasted less than 18 months, by which time the six band members had reformed, and were starring weekly in Izzard's TV show.  Other notable television appearances were on BBC Television's Whicker's World ("Living with Uncle Sam featuring Brits in America") and A Small Problem, starring The Young Ones' Christopher Ryan.

By 1986, and now sharing a squat in Brixton, The Vulcans had become stalwarts on the London gig scene. They performed their best known song, "Hard Hat Zone", an analogous comment on the dangers of living in urban areas. Preoccupations with mental difficulties caused by heavy drinking peppered their lyrics. "Diddle-I", an electric folk piece was produced by the saxophonist, Pete Thomas, and it received regular radio airplay.

In 1987, weighed down by drum machines and synthesisers, the band widened their repertoire to embark on conceptual compositions. They split in January 1989.

External links
Band's website

British rock music groups